A pit bike is a small recreation, stunt or motocross racing motorcycle. Usually defined as having a small engine that is air cooled engine and this bike is usually not used in a professional racing

Pit bike history 
The pit bike evolved from the use of custom-built motorized two wheeled machines (also known as clown bikes) that began appearing during post-war 1940s and 50s pits of racing events. Initially, the term also applied to the use of bicycles or motorcycles used to navigate event staging areas. These hand-built machines were directly responsible for the creation of the Minibike Market. The fairly cheap price and the mobility of Minibikes made them easy to use at racing events. As the minibike market boomed in the 1960s, Honda introduced their own line, and the Honda Z series became popular for filling the role. With the popularity of off-road motorcycles increasing through the 1980s, inexpensive introductory-model motocross and Dual-sport bikes also began to fill this role.

While determining the catalyst for pit bike popularity cannot be solidified to a single factor, major influences likely include the X Games, televised on ESPN, and promotional Direct-to-video Power Sport and stunt films in the 1990s. Series such as the Crusty Demons of Dirt, have been credited by fans for inspiring people to race or attempt stunts using undersized Motorcycles. This began a popular trend of backyard Stunt riding, and the inexpensive, undersized off-road motorcycles long associated as pit bikes became popular for such use. The Internet and video sharing boom of the early 2000s has also credited by fans of such activities on various forums for popularizing pit bike riding off-road.

By 2001, Honda had discontinued the Z-series in North America, and the bike that filled that role in marketing was the Honda XR50R, which became part of the CRF line of motocross bikes in 2004. The bike, which closely resembled larger off-road motorcycles, was designed as an introduction model specifically for motocross. As teenagers and young adults began to show interest in these introductory models, a cottage industry for aftermarket parts became available, making bikes more powerful and comfortable for bigger riders. Some of these parts include heavy duty suspension, tall handle bars, tall seats, and big bore kits. In 2002 Kawasaki released the KLX110. This bike was also designed for smaller riders. As the 110 Model is faster and larger than an XR50, it required fewer modifications to make it comfortable for bigger riders. Pit bike riders realized this and started moving to the KLX110. Most major manufacturers offered a small, introductory motocross bike, which can be repurposed for pit bike racing.

In the early-2000s, Honda and Yamaha moved manufacturing of CRF50, CRF110 and TTR110 pit bikes to China. Honda has a local Chinese company Sundiro Honda Manurfactuer all models. Not long after new companies and brands were founded and also started manufacturing in China, marketed by local dealers and powered by various Base 50 engine configurations, began appearing on the North American market. Now the most common style of pit bike (and specifically marketed as Pit Bikes, opposed to introductory motocross models) A broad look these machines are based on the Honda CRF50 and feature the perimeter frame chassis. New versions feature a CRF 50 motor mounts and may have a displacement between 50-190 CC. The typical wheel size is a 14" front and 12" rear wheel. These models were less expensive (up to 60% less than Honda and Yamaha manufacturers) and use parts compatible with the established aftermarket industry.

Pit bike racing

Pit Bike racing is a competition sport similar to motocross. It is especially popular with younger riders, as the machines are initially more affordable, less intimidating and easier to maintain than standard motocross bikes. The shorter wheel base, lower center of gravity and linear power delivery simplifies handling aspects for novice competitors, resulting in fewer accidents and injuries.

A typical Pit Bike event consists of numerous classes designated by bike types racing for a set number of laps on a track during two or more legs.  The winner is determined by the highest average position at the end of the event. Pit Bike motocross, often referred to as Minimotos, not to be confused with MiniMoto Pocketbike racing, is the most common discipline of pit bike racing. Extreme sports influences have also made Mini FMX popular. This is a version of Freestyle motocross, with a focus on trick riding. Freestyle motocross riders are known to use pit bikes to learn certain tricks, in an attempt to limit injury if not performed correctly.

Many pit bike race series have appeared across the United States. Series include the 2-Up Minis and Masters of Minis race series, both located in the North East, the Sho-Me series in Missouri, and the annual MiniMoto Supercross race held the day before the final round of the AMA Pro Supercross series in Las Vegas, NV. In 2020 Travis Pastrana introduced the Pastranaland Bike World Championship.

Pit Bikes are also used for stunt riding. For Serious stunting, it is recommended by practitioners that modifications, including pegs and an additional lever above the clutch for the rear brake (for when your right foot is not covering the brake pedal) be utilized. A 12 bar can also be added to the subframe which is designed to prevent a bike from flipping.

See also 
 All-terrain vehicle
 Honda Z series - also known as a Monkey bike

References

Minibikes